Stephanie Lynn Logterman (born February 25, 1986) is an American former soccer defender who played for Saint Louis Athletica of Women's Professional Soccer, and was a member of the United States U-20 and U-23 women's national soccer teams.

Logterman retired in March 2010 in order to further her medical school studies, having received a scholarship grant that she felt she could not pass up.

References

External links

 
 US Soccer player profile
 Saint Louis Athletica player profile
 Texas player profile
 Action Photos

Living people
Texas Longhorns women's soccer players
Saint Louis Athletica players
1986 births
American women's soccer players
Women's association football defenders
United States women's under-20 international soccer players
Soccer players from Austin, Texas
Women's Professional Soccer players